Attack on Titan: Counter Rockets, also known as  and Attack on Titan: Beacon for Counterattack, is a Japanese live-action web miniseries based on the manga series Attack on Titan by Hajime Isayama. It serves as a prequel to the 2015 live-action Attack on Titan film.

Plot 
A three-episode web series based on the live-action film adaptations, Attack on Titan and Attack on Titan: End of the World. It features the same cast from the movies and tells a new story about the everyday lives and secrets of soldiers; particularly Hange's Titan research and the creation of the omni-directional mobility gear in the films' continuity.

Cast

 Satomi Ishihara as Hange
 Nanami Sakuraba as  Sasha
 Rina Takeda as Lil
 Shu Watanabe as Fukushi
 Ayame Misaki as Hiana
 Yuta Hiraoka as Izuru
 Yu Kamio as Yunohira

Episodes

Production
As of June 27, 2015, cast members Satomi Ishihara (Hange), Nanami Sakuraba (Sasha), Shu Watanabe (Fukushi), Rina Takeda (Lil), and Kamio Yu (Yunohira) have been confirmed to appear in the series; along with Yuta Hiraoka as an original character for the web drama, Izuru.
"Hangeki no Yaiba" ("Counter Blade"), performed by Japanese rock band Wagakki Band, was revealed as the theme song for the series, and it will be included in the band's upcoming second full album Yasou Emaki to be released on September 2.

Home media
In 2016, both Australia's Madman Entertainment and Hong Kong's Edko Films released the series on Blu-ray and DVD under the title Attack on Titan: Hangeki no Noroshi in Japanese with English subtitles.

References

External links 
  at dTV 
 

Japanese drama television series
2015 Japanese television series debuts
2015 Japanese television series endings
Japanese television dramas based on manga
Counter Rockets
Prequel television series